Pascal Renfer (born 25 October 1977) is a Swiss footballer who currently plays as striker for AC Lugano.

External links
football.ch profile

1977 births
Swiss men's footballers
Living people
FC Solothurn players
FC Zürich players
FC Thun players
FC Lugano players
Swiss Super League players
Association football forwards
FC Schaffhausen players
FC Winterthur players
Yverdon-Sport FC players
FC Wangen bei Olten players
Place of birth missing (living people)